In taxonomy, Methanobrevibacter is a genus of the Methanobacteriaceae. The species within Methanobrevibacter are strictly anaerobic archaea that produce methane, for the most part through the reduction of carbon dioxide via hydrogen. Most species live in the intestines of larger organisms, such as termites and are responsible for the large quantities of greenhouse gases that they produce. Mbr. smithii, found in the human intestine, may play a role in obesity.

Nomenclature
The name Methanobrevibacter has Latin and Greek roots. Methanum is Latin for methane, brevi is Latin for short, and bacter is Greek for bar.

Professional publications use the abbreviations M., Mbb., and Mbr., as in M. smithii, Mbb. smithii, and Mbr. smithii.

Phylogeny
The currently accepted taxonomy is based on the List of Prokaryotic names with Standing in Nomenclature (LPSN)  and National Center for Biotechnology Information (NCBI).

See also
 List of Archaea genera

References

Further reading

Scientific journals

Scientific books

Scientific databases

External links

Archaea genera
Euryarchaeota